Calling a Wolf a Wolf is a confessional collection of poetry written by Iranian-American poet Kaveh Akbar.  The collection of poetry is a personal narrative that follows a path through addiction and to recovery. Akbar claims this collection, along with a chapbook, Portrait of an Alcoholic, was his own personal way of processing what he experienced as an addict and even solidifying and making sense of his sobriety. The collection is written to mold what Akbar felt through not only the process of and recovery from addiction but elaborates on how Akbar's addiction completely isolated him from society and made the world around him so surreal.

Background 
Iranian-American poet Kaveh Akbar wrote this confessional poetry collection to share his experiences as an alcoholic. He elaborates on how ethereal the world around him feels and how isolated his own addiction has made him and writes of the path that he ventured on his way to recovery.

Content

Themes & structure 
The themes of the collection center mainly around Akbar's path through addiction and finding his way to recovery. Akbar uses deft language to mentally recreate the isolation that addicts feel and how the world around them may feel hypnagogic or unreal. He tells of story of how a man transformed entirely, then had to push against addiction to become a new man to better life for oneself. The narrative highlights the enjoyments and agonies through addiction that could cause addicts to battle their own inclination and even isolate themselves from everything and everyone to fulfill their addictions, resulting in the loneliness Akbar experienced throughout.

The structure of the collection intends to display a transformation of a man into a new better man or the man inside changing oneself. The collection almost chronologically displays his enjoyment of being an alcoholic and being able to escape the world then the collection changes tones into the pain of addiction and the battling of self-persuasion to escape addiction. The poems then shift to a sense of recovery and coming to understand that instead of escaping the world that is around, find something to enjoy.

Publication & awards

Publication 
"Calling a Wolf a Wolf" was originally published by Alice James Books on September 12, 2017 in the United States and was later published by Penguin Books in the United Kingdom on January 2, 2018.

Awards 

 A 2017 NPR Best Book of the Year

References 

2017 poetry books
English-language poems
American poetry collections
Poems about drugs
Works about alcoholism
Alice James Books books